Bierbeek is a municipality located in the Belgian province of Flemish Brabant. The municipality comprises the towns of Bierbeek proper, Korbeek-Lo, Lovenjoel and Opvelp. On January 1, 2006, Bierbeek had a total population of 9,147. The total area is 39.73 km² which gives a population density of 230 inhabitants per km².

Born
 Gaston Roelants (born 1937), athlete
 Frederik Veuchelen (born 1978), cyclist
 IncognitoNael (Born 2004), Poet, Top G
 Skata Guru (Born 1654), Ereburger van "De 36"
 smirnov verre (born 2003), Entrepreneur
 MSKN gang (born 2018)(Led by "Je favo zandzever (founder)"), gang

References

External links
 
Official website - Available only in Flemish

 
Municipalities of Flemish Brabant